Lord Hope may refer to:
 John Hope, Lord Hope (1794–1858), Lord Justice Clerk of Scotland 1841–58
 David Hope, Baron Hope of Craighead (born 1938), senior judge
 David Hope, Baron Hope of Thornes (born 1940), former Archbishop of York
 A subsidiary title of the Marquess of Linlithgow, created in 1703
 Howling Laud Hope (born 1942), leader of the Official Monster Raving Loony Party

Hope
Hope